Polloc may refer to the following places in the Philippines:

 Polloc, a barangay of the municipality of Parang, Maguindanao del Norte
 Polloc Port, in Parang, Maguindanao del Norte
 Polloc Harbor, a bay off the coast of Maguindanao del Norte
 , a former commandancy that was part of the Cotabato District of the Spanish Empire
 Polloc Islet, part of the municipality of Banton, Romblon, Philippines

See also
 Polloc and Govan Railway
 Pollock (disambiguation)